Botanical gardens in Latvia have collections consisting entirely of Latvia native and endemic species; most have a collection that include plants from around the world. There are botanical gardens and arboreta in all states and territories of Latvia, most are administered by local governments, some are privately owned.
 University of Latvia Botanical Garden – Riga
 National Botanic Garden of Latvia – Salaspils
 Kalsnava Arboretum – Kalsnava Parish, Latvia

References 

Latvia
Botanical gardens